Rio Grande City Grulla Independent School District (RGCGISD), formerly Rio Grande City Consolidated Independent School District, is a public school district based in Rio Grande City, Texas (USA).

In 2009, the school district was "recognized" by the Texas Education Agency.

Catchment area
The district serves communities in southeastern Starr County including the cities of Rio Grande City and La Grulla, and several census-designated places. Census-designated places served by RGCCISD include:

Airport Heights
Alto Bonito Heights
Amada Acres
Barrera (portion)
B and E
Buena Vista
Camargito
Casa Blanca
Chaparrito
East Alto Bonito
East Lopez
El Brazil
El Castillo
El Chaparral
El Mesquite
El Rancho Vela
El Refugio
El Socio
Elias-Fela Solis
Eugenio Saenz
Fernando Salinas
Garciasville
Garza-Salinas II
Gutierrez
La Carla
La Casita
La Escondida
La Paloma Ranchettes
La Puerta
La Victoria
Las Lomas
Loma Linda East
Longoria
Los Alvarez (eastern half)
Manuel Garcia
Manuel Garcia II
Martinez
Mi Ranchito Estate
Mikes
Narciso Pena
Netos
Nina
Olivia Lopez de Gutierrez
Olmito and Olmito
Pablo Pena
Quesada
Ramirez-Perez
Ranchitos del Norte
Rivereno
Sammy Martinez
San Fernando
Santa Cruz
Santa Rosa
Santel
Valle Hermoso
Valle Vista
Victoria Vera
Villarreal
West Alto Bonito (formerly Alto Bonito)
Zarate

In regards to former CDPs:

Formerly Garciasville and La Casita were one CDP, La Casita-Garciasville.

Other former CDPs:
Former El Refugio
Former La Puerta
Former Santa Cruz
Los Alvarez (partial)
Los Villareales (most)

Schools
There are 14 schools in the Rio Grande Consolidated ISD.

High School (Grades 9-12)
Grulla High School
Rio Grande City High School 
Preparatory For Early College High School

Middle Schools (Grades 6-8)
Grulla Middle School

 In 2022 the district was constructing a $36,200,000 replacement facility, which is to have  of space.
Ringgold Middle School

Veterans Middle School

Academy For Academic Enrichment Middle School

Elementary Schools (Grades PK-5)
Alto Bonito Elementary School
Roque Guerra Jr. Elementary School
Grulla Elementary School
John & Olive Hinojosa Elementary School
La Union Elementary School
North Grammar Elementary School
Dr. Mario E. Ramirez Elementary School
Ringgold Elementary School
General Ricardo Sanchez Elementary School
Academy for Academic Enhancement Elementary

References

External links
 

School districts in Starr County, Texas